Vitálii Volodýmyrovych Klychkó (born 19 July 1971), known as Vitali Klitschko, is a Ukrainian politician and former professional boxer who serves as mayor of Kyiv and head of the Kyiv City State Administration, having held both offices since June 2014. Klitschko is a former leader of the Petro Poroshenko Bloc and a former Member of the Ukrainian Parliament. He became actively involved in Ukrainian politics in 2005 and combined this with his professional boxing career until his retirement from the sport in 2013.  He holds a Doctoral Degree (Ph.D.) from Kyiv University's Physical Science Department.

As a boxer, Klitschko won multiple world heavyweight championships. He held the World Boxing Organization (WBO) title from 1999 to 2000, the Ring magazine title from 2004 to 2005, and the World Boxing Council (WBC) title twice between 2004 and 2013. Overall, he defeated 15 opponents in world heavyweight title fights, and made 12 successful title defences. In 2011, Vitali and his younger brother Wladimir Klitschko entered the Guinness World Records as the pair of brothers with most world heavyweight title fight wins (30 at the time; 40 as of 2020). From 2006 until 2015, Vitali and Wladimir (also a multiple world champion) dominated heavyweight boxing, a period widely known as the "Klitschko Era" of the division. Klitschko's last fight was in 2012, but he remained the WBC heavyweight champion at age 42 when he announced his retirement in December 2013.

Klitschko formally began his political career in 2006 when he placed second in the Kyiv mayoral race. In 2010, he founded the party Ukrainian Democratic Alliance for Reform (UDAR) and was elected into parliament for this party in 2012. He was a leading figure in the 2013–2014 Euromaidan protests, and he announced his possible candidacy for the Ukrainian presidency but later withdrew and endorsed the eventual winner Petro Poroshenko. He was elected Mayor of Kyiv on 25 May 2014. He headed the election list of the winner of the 2014 Ukrainian parliamentary election, the Petro Poroshenko Bloc, but he gave up his parliamentary seat to stay on as Mayor of Kyiv. On 28 August 2015 the UDAR party merged into Petro Poroshenko Bloc. Klitschko thus became the new party leader. Klitschko was reelected as mayor on 15 November 2015. Klitschko revived UDAR, and left Petro Poroshenko Bloc with it, in May 2019 and simultaneously announced that UDAR would take part in the 2019 Ukrainian parliamentary election autonomously. UDAR however failed to win any seats.

Klitschko was re-elected to a second term as mayor in 2020, securing 50.52% of the votes in the first round of voting and thus avoiding a run-off. Following the 2022 Russian invasion of Ukraine, Klitschko and President Volodymyr Zelensky have been internationally praised as symbols of Ukrainian resistance.

Kickboxing and amateur boxing career
Originally, as karate and kickboxing were both banned in the Soviet Union, and amateur boxing was one of five sanctioned combat sports available to general public (along with judo, sport sambo, freestyle and classical wrestling), Klitschko took up boxing, being trained by former Soviet boxer, 1974 World Championships bronze medalist Anatoliy Klimanov, a head boxing coach of the CSKA Kyiv Sports Club. After the ban was lifted and Soviets assembled their kickboxing team, Klitschko was its member. He was competing both in amateur boxing, kickboxing, and sport karate simultaneously, showing considerable success in all combat sports which he was involved in.

 X Summer Spartakiad of Peoples of the USSR, boxing (+91 kg), Minsk, Belarus SSR, July 1991:
 1/2: Lost to Oleg Maskaev (Uzbek SSR) RSC 2
 WAKO European Kickboxing Championships, light contact division (+89  kg), Varna, Bulgaria, November 1992:
 Finals: Lost to Pelé Reid (England) KO 
Japanese mixed martial arts promotion Pancrase – All Japan Kickboxing Federation under WKA Special Rules (no low kicks), Tokyo, Japan, 27 November 1993:
 Defeated Ryūshi Yanagisawa (Japan) PTS 5 
 ISKA World Super Heavyweight Championships, 1994:
 Finals: Defeated Richard Vince (United Kingdom) KO 2
 XVI President's Boxing Cup (+91 kg) Jakarta, Indonesia, February 1994:
 1/2: Lost to Christophe Mendy (France) PTS
VII Boxing World Cup (+91 kg), Bangkok, Thailand, June 1994:
 1/8: Defeated Ahn Jung-hyun (South Korea) RSCH 5
 1/4: Lost to Svilen Rusinov (Bulgaria) 9–10 (5 rds)
 XLI World Military Boxing Championships (+91 kg), Tunis, Tunisia, 1994:
 Finals: Lost to Alexei Lezin (Russia) 1–10

 XXIII Chemistry Cup (+91 kg), Halle, Germany, March 1995:
 1/4: Defeated Willi Fischer (Germany) 10–0
 1/2: Defeated René Monse (Germany) 9–3
 Finals: Defeated Georgi Kandelaki (Georgia) by walkover
 World Championships (+91 kg), Berlin, Germany, May 1995:
 1/16: Defeated Igor Kshinin (Russia) RSC 1
 1/8: Defeated Gytis Juškevičius (Lithuania) RSC 2
 1/4: Defeated Attila Levin (Sweden) RET 2
 1/2: Defeated René Monse (Germany) 6–5
 Finals: Lost to Alexei Lezin (Russia) 3–12
 Military World Games (+91 kg), Ariccia, Italy, September 1995:
 1/8: Defeated Drago Mijić (Croatia) by walkover
 1/4: Defeated Kenneth Horsley (United States) RET 1
 1/2: Defeated Svilen Rusinov (Bulgaria) RSC 1
 Finals: Defeated Alexei Lezin (Russia) 9–4
 WAKO European Kickboxing Championships, light contact division (+89 kg), Kyiv, Ukraine, November 1995:
 Finals: Lost to William van Roosmalen (Netherlands) KO 

Amateur boxing record: 195 wins, 15 losses.

Kickboxing record: 34 wins (22 knockouts,) 2 losses (2 knockouts.)

He was a kickboxing world champion six times (winning amateur world championships twice and professional championship tournaments four times). In 1996, he finished his amateur boxing career and turned professional, signing with the German-based Universum Box-Promotion (UBP.)

Professional boxing career

As an amateur, Klitschko won the super-heavyweight championship at the first World Military Games in Italy in 1995. In the same year he won a silver medal at the World Championships in Berlin, Germany, where he was defeated by Russia's Alexei Lezin in the final. In his autobiography, published in Germany in 2004, the boxer revealed that he tested positive for a banned steroid in 1996. He attributed the presence of the drug to treatment of a leg injury, but was dismissed from the Ukrainian boxing team and missed the Atlanta Olympics. His brother Wladimir moved up from heavyweight to super heavyweight to take his place in the squad and won the Olympic gold medal. His amateur record was 195–15 with 80 knockouts.

WBO heavyweight champion
Klitschko began his professional boxing career in 1996, winning his first twenty-four fights by either early knockout or technical knockout. He and Wladimir signed with the German athlete-promotion company Universum. With both brothers holding PhDs and being multilingual, their refined and articulate personalities made for mainstream marketability when they moved to Germany and Universum. In time, they became national celebrities in their adopted home country. In his 25th pro fight on 26 June 1999, Klitschko won the WBO heavyweight title from Herbie Hide of the United Kingdom by a second-round knockout. He successfully defended the title twice. He defeated Ed Mahone by knockout in the third round and beat Obed Sullivan, who retired after the ninth round.

Title loss to Byrd

By April 2000 Klitschko was unbeaten and a rising star in the heavyweight division, having won all 27 of his contests by knockout. On 1 April, Klitschko had a third title defense against the American Chris Byrd, who was a late replacement. Byrd made himself a difficult target and tried to thwart Klitschko's offense by being elusive. Klitschko won most of the rounds and was heading towards a comprehensive points victory when he suffered a serious shoulder injury. After the ninth round, Klitschko notified his corner that he had a shoulder pain and threw in the towel, thus handing Klitschko his first defeat and awarding Byrd the win by RTD. At the time of the stoppage, Klitschko had won 8 of 9 rounds on one judge's scorecard, and 7 of 9 on the two others. Klitschko, who was later diagnosed with a torn rotator cuff, received much criticism for quitting the fight. Klitschko rebounded from his loss to Byrd by reeling off five victories in a row, earning himself a shot at WBC heavyweight champion Lennox Lewis.

Klitschko vs. Lennox Lewis

The fight between Lewis and Klitschko was to take place in December 2003, and Klitschko signed for a tune-up fight on 21 June 2003 as part of the undercard of Lewis's fight with Kirk Johnson for the IBO title, as the WBC would not sanction the fight for their title. Johnson, however, pulled out of the fight due to injury and Klitschko, due to his being in training for a fight on the same day as Lewis, took the fight on short notice. Immediately after he accepted, the WBC elected to sanction the fight as a title match and Lewis's The Ring title was also up for grabs in addition to his lineal title.

Klitschko, a 4–1 underdog, dominated the early going with many harder punches. He stunned Lewis in the second round with two hard rights, leaving a cut under Lewis's left eye. In the third, Lewis landed a big right hand that opened a deep cut above Klitschko's left eye. Before the seventh round, the ringside doctor inspected the wound and deemed it severe enough to threaten eye damage if struck again, stopping the fight despite Klitschko's pleas to continue. Klitschko was ahead on all three judges' scorecards 58–56 (4 rounds to 2) at the time of the stoppage, but because the wound was a result of punches from Lewis, Lewis won by technical knockout.

Negotiations for a 6 December rematch began. After negotiations collapsed, Klitschko defeated Kirk Johnson in a WBC eliminator bout on 6 December date, setting up a mandatory rematch with Lewis. In January 2004, the WBC announced that it would strip Lewis of the belt if he let pass a 15 March deadline to sign for a rematch with Klitschko. Shortly thereafter, Lewis announced his retirement and vacated the title. For years after this fight, Klitschko would occasionally call out Lewis for a rematch, despite the latter having retired in early 2004.

Around this time the Klitschko brothers moved from Hamburg, Germany, to Los Angeles. In January 2004 they notified Universum that they would not re-sign when their contracts expired in April. Universum sued the brothers, arguing that their recent injuries had triggered a clause binding them beyond April. The suit was ultimately resolved in favor of the Klitschkos in November 2009.

WBC and The Ring heavyweight champion

Klitschko faced South African Corrie Sanders on 24 April 2004 for the WBC heavyweight championship and The Ring belts that had been vacated by Lewis. Sanders had stopped younger brother Wladimir in the second round (TKO) on 8 March 2003. Klitschko took a heavy shot in round one by Sanders and was almost knocked down right at the end of the round, but by using upper-body movement and accurate punching he broke down Sanders over the following rounds, forcing referee Jon Schorle to stop the bout in the eighth. Klitschko landed 60% of his power punches.

Klitschko vs. Williams
Klitschko's first WBC title defense was against British boxer Danny Williams. Williams had become suddenly marketable from a KO over Mike Tyson in round 4. Klitschko scored a technical knockout against Williams in 8 rounds on 11 December 2004, while wearing an orange cloth to show support for the Ukrainian presidential opposition movement. Klitschko knocked Williams down in the 1st, 3rd, 7th, and 8th rounds before the fight was stopped. Immediately afterward, Klitschko dedicated his victory to democracy in his native Ukraine and also to the Ukrainian presidential candidate Viktor Yushchenko, whom he supported on 26 December 2004, election revote.

2005–2007 retirement
On 9 November 2005, Klitschko announced his retirement from professional boxing and vacated his title. He had been training to fight Hasim Rahman; however, nine days before the fight, he injured his leg while sparring. He snapped his anterior cruciate ligament, which with surgery would take up to a year to heal and possibly prove career ending. To avoid keeping the title out of use, he retired. The WBC was grateful for his consideration. On other occasions he cited regrets about his suddenly mounting injuries, a desire to leave the sport while still on top and political aspirations in his home country of Ukraine. Following his retirement, the WBC conferred "champion emeritus" status on Klitschko, and assured him he would become the mandatory challenger if and when he decided to return.

Second WBC heavyweight championship
On 3 August 2008 the WBC awarded Klitschko a chance to regain his WBC heavyweight title. After Vitali's retirement, his younger brother had established dominance in the division, winning two of the four world titles available. The reigning WBC Champion was Samuel Peter (who had lost a decision to Wladimir in 2005). At the time, there was interest in a potential Peter vs. Wladimir unification match. Instead, Vitali took advantage of his champion emeritus status and secured a title challenge against Peter. The fight was arranged on 11 October 2008 at O2 World, Berlin. It would be one of the most anticipated heavyweight fights in the past few years. Both men had a rightful claim to being the champion and the stakes for the future of the heavyweight division were high. Despite some questioning Klitschko's decision to return after almost four years, he managed to regain his title in dominating fashion. Klitschko had Peter intimidated from the first round and stunned him with accurate hard punches. Klitschko kept the hard-punching Nigerian off with an effective left jab and took control in the center of the ring. Over eight rounds, Klitschko completely dismantled and outfought the younger champion. After the eighth round, Peter slumped on his stool, shook his head and asked that the bout be stopped. With the Samuel Peter victory, Klitschko technically became one of the few men to ever hold a version of the world heavyweight title three times—WBO (1999–2000), WBC (2004–2005) and WBC (2008–2012).

Klitschko vs. Gómez, Arreola, Johnson
On 21 March 2009, Klitschko defeated Juan Carlos Gómez by TKO in the ninth round. Gómez tried to use his movement to thwart Klitschko, but seemed unable to cope with the power and physical strength of his opponent. As the rounds progressed, Klitschko began imposing himself on Gómez more and more. Gómez soon became wary of Klitschko's power and also began to tire physically. By the sixth round, Klitschko was in total control. The end came when the referee stopped the fight in the ninth round as Gómez appeared unable to withstand any more hits.

On 26 September, Klitschko earned a one-sided TKO victory over Chris Arreola at the Staples Center in Los Angeles when Arreola's trainer, Henry Ramirez, asked the referee to stop the fight. Arreola was considered at the time one of the division's hardest punchers; however, Klitschko kept Arreola at bay with his left jab and hit him almost at will with his right. Arreola had been influenced by Samuel Peter's defeat to Klitschko in 2008, in which Peter had tried to box from the outside. He therefore employed a game-plan which involved applying constant pressure to Klitschko in order to force him into a high tempo fight. Despite his best efforts, the bout became one sided very quickly. Klitschko consistently proved himself faster, sharper and much fitter than Arreola.

On 12 December, Klitschko defeated Kevin Johnson by unanimous decision, winning almost every round. Johnson, a skillful fighter, tried to negate Klitschko's strength with angles and head movement. Though he proved hard to hit, he failed to launch any sustained attack of his own. After the Johnson bout, Klitschko's camp began negotiations for a potential fight with former WBA champion Nikolai Valuev, but the match failed to materialize due to economic disagreements.

Klitschko vs. Sosnowski, Briggs, Solís
On 29 May 2010, Klitschko defeated Polish heavyweight contender Albert Sosnowski by KO at 2:30 in round 10 of 12. Sosnowski was knocked down by a right hand in the 10th round, prompting referee Jay Nady to immediately wave off the fight. The fight took place at Veltins-Arena, Gelsenkirchen, North Rhine-Westphalia, Germany.
This voluntary defense was Klitschko's fourth defense of the WBC heavyweight title. Sosnowski was the No. 11 ranked heavyweight according to the WBC prior to this bout.

On 17 August 2010, it was announced that Klitschko would defend his WBC title against Shannon Briggs on 16 October of that year. Klitschko completely dismantled his challenger with superior hand speed. Briggs struggled to land any meaningful punches, as Klitschko won every round decisively. After a few rounds, Briggs was receiving a vicious and sustained beating which caused him serious facial injuries. Considering the beating he was receiving, there was some suggestion that the referee should have stopped the bout during the last few rounds. Klitschko had retained his belt with official scores of 120–107, 120–107, and 120–105.

During the post-fight interview, the American boxer Briggs said: "I've fought George Foreman, I've fought Lennox Lewis, and Vitali's the best." While Klitschko did not knock down Briggs, the latter collapsed after the fight and was hospitalized with facial fractures and a torn biceps.

Klitschko's next fight was against mandatory challenger Odlanier Solís. The bout was tentatively scheduled for March 2011. On 11 January, it was officially confirmed that the fight between Klitschko and Solís was going to take place in Cologne, Germany on 19 March 2011. The fight lasted less than one whole round, as a right hand to Solís's temple wobbled Solís, who then twisted his knee. Klitschko won by KO. Klitschko reportedly earned $15 million for the bout.

Klitschko vs. Adamek, Chisora, Charr

Now aged 40, Klitschko retained his WBC heavyweight title against Tomasz Adamek on 10 September 2011 in Poland, winning by TKO in the 10th round, in the first ever PPV fight in Polish TV history. The referee stopped the bout after Adamek received punishing blows and was ruled out, as he was no longer able to defend himself.

After turning 41 on 19 July 2012, Klitschko became one of the oldest heavyweight champions in history. Despite having a four-year hiatus from the sport, Klitschko has proven to be a remarkably effective and dominant heavyweight champion once again. Alongside his brother Wladimir, he also fights on for their shared ambition of holding all four heavyweight titles together, an ambition that was realised on 2 July 2011 when brother Wladimir defeated David Haye to win the WBA heavyweight title.

In January 2012, he was awarded WBC Fighter of the Year for 2011. Klitschko was in negotiations for a possible bout with former WBA heavyweight title holder David Haye on 3 March 2012.

After Wladimir Klitschko had to cancel his fight with Jean-Marc Mormeck, it was thought that Vitali was likely to fight on 25 February 2012. Sources in Germany reported that he was likely to fight British contender Derek Chisora on 18 February 2012 in Olympiahalle, Munich, Bavaria.

It was confirmed on 12 December 2011 that Derek Chisora would be Klitschko's next opponent. Klitschko retained his WBC title unanimously in a dominant display in Munich. The fight was fought against a backdrop of antagonism displayed by Chisora at the weigh in. Chisora slapped Klitschko across the face causing a red mark to be left. The next day Chisora spat water over the face of Vitali's brother Wladimir.

Vitali won the majority of the rounds boxing a disciplined fight with changing angles and superior footwork. Chisora, constantly coming forward delivering punishing body shots, failed to wear down the older man. The scores were: 118–110, 118–110, and 119–111. The next day Klitschko visited a hospital to check his shoulder, claiming he injured it in the fight. A doctor confirmed a ligament tear was suffered in his left shoulder. Klitschko said he "suddenly lost strength in the left hand" and was forced to only use his right. The injury was believed to have happened in the second or third round. Klitschko's trainer, Fritz Sdunek, believes this is the same kind of injury Klitschko suffered in his fight with Byrd.

At the post-fight press conference, a brawl ensued between Haye and Chisora. After the altercation, Chisora challenged Haye to a fight in the ring and said, "I am going to shoot David Haye." Chisora was later arrested at a German airport along with his coach, Don Charles. His comments and actions were later condemned by Frank Warren, his promoter, and Wladimir Klitschko.

On 2 July 2012, it was announced that Vitali will defend his WBC heavyweight title on 8 September at the Olympic Indoor Arena in Moscow, Russia. His opponent for the fight was undefeated future WBA heavyweight champion Manuel Charr 21–0 (11 KO). Klitschko won the fight via technical knockout when Charr had to be stopped due to a cut received from Klitschko's punches.

Klitschko was expected to face Bermane Stiverne in a mandatory title defense, but was forced to pull out due to injury.

Retirement from boxing
On 15 December 2013, Klitschko stepped back from boxing. He was announced champion emeritus, which means that if he wants to return to boxing, he can fight the WBC heavyweight champion without having any fights beforehand. But (right after his retirement from boxing), Klitschko stated "That is something I currently cannot imagine". The WBC title was vacated and later contested by Chris Arreola and Bermane Stiverne. Commenting on his decision, he stated "My focus is on politics in Ukraine and I feel the people there need me". He also added, "I thank the WBC and its president José Sulaimán for the support in our battle for democracy and freedom in Ukraine". Since his retirement, he has maintained a low key level of training and has been in his brother's corner for most fights, most famously when he had an altercation with Anthony Joshua after Anthony Joshua vs. Wladimir Klitschko.

Political career

Early years in politics

During the 2004 Ukrainian presidential election and the following Orange Revolution, the Klitschko brothers openly supported the candidacy of Viktor Yushchenko. In 2005, Vitali Klitschko was appointed an adviser to President Yushchenko. In October 2006, he was promoted to full-time adviser.

Klitschko began campaigning for Mayor of Kyiv shortly after his retirement in 2005. He lost the 2006 mayoral election to Leonid Chernovetskyi but placed second with 26% of the vote, ahead of the incumbent Oleksandr Omelchenko Klitschko campaigned on an anti-corruption platform and lead the bloc "Civic party" PORA-ROP (the parties PORA and Reforms and Order Party) in the simultaneously held local elections for the Kyiv City Council. Analysts stated his relatively late entry into the campaign might have cost him votes. Still, Klitschko was elected as a people's deputy to the Kyiv City Council since "Civic party" PORA-ROP won 14 seats in the 2006 election.  In the May 2008 Kyiv local election, he ran again and won 18% of the vote. Klitschko simultaneously led the Vitali Klitschko Bloc that won 10.61% of the votes and 15 seats and again, he was elected into the Kyiv City Council. His campaign hired Rudy Giuliani as a consultant for the campaign. In 2008, he was also appointed to the Ukrainian delegation of the Congress of the Council of Europe.

Klitschko became the leader of the political party Ukrainian Democratic Alliance for Reform (UDAR) in April 2010. During the 2010 Ukrainian local elections, the party won representatives in (Ukrainian) municipalities and Oblast Councils (regional parliaments).

Klitschko and UDAR became a partner of the Christian Democratic Union of Germany in November 2011. UDAR is supported by the German government and the Konrad Adenauer Foundation and received support in particular from Angela Merkel and also politicians from the conservative European People's Party. According to information gained by the German magazine Der Spiegel, the target was to "set up Klitschko purposefully as a new strong man in Kyiv—in order to counter this way the Kremlin's growing influence". Support consisted in logistics, training and joint performances. Assistance was also promised by Christoph Heusgen, Ronald Pofalla and Guido Westerwelle.

In October 2011, Klitschko announced that he would run in the 2012 Kyiv mayoral election.

During the 2012 Ukrainian parliamentary election, Klitschko was elected (he was top candidate on UDAR's party list) into the Ukrainian parliament; UDAR won 13.97% of the popular vote and 34 seats under the nationwide proportional party-list system, finishing third behind the Party of Regions and Fatherland, and another 6 seats in constituencies, thus a total of 40 seats. Support for UDAR was the least diversified at the regional level compared with the results of the other leading parties. Klitschko was chosen as the leader of the party's faction in Parliament.

Klitschko announced on 24 October 2013 that he intended to take part in the next Ukrainian presidential election that was then set for 2015. That same day, the parliament voted for a bill adopting two amendments to the Tax Code, according to which a person who has permanent residency in a foreign state is considered to be a person who does not live in Ukraine; the law also had a provision according to which only a person "permanently residing in Ukraine for ten years" can run for the president. 239 deputies voted for the bill, mostly from the Party of Regions and the Communist Party. Experts and lawyers then argued that it was unclear if Klitschko could take part in these elections as, according to media reports, he had a residence permit in Germany.

Opinion polls since early 2011 showed that the predicted percentage of votes that Klitschko would gain in the first round of the 2014 Ukrainian presidential election enlarged from 4.8% in December 2011 to 15.1% in February 2013, and an October 2013 Razumkov Centre poll predicted 19.3%. According to all opinion polls but two conducted from January to November 2013 by the Razumkov Centre, Kyiv International Institute of Sociology (KIIS), SOCIS, Rating, International Republican Institute and the Democratic Initiatives, Viktor Yanukovych and Klitschko were most likely to go into the second round. For the second round, all opinion polls conducted by same agencies during the same period of time had Vitali winning the potential run-off against Yanukovych, predicting Vitali to earn from 58% to 64%.

Klitschko was one of the dominant figures of the Euromaidan protests. During these protests, he retired from boxing.

Political views (until 2013)
Klitschko is in favor of the Association Agreement between Ukraine and the European Union. He sees the European Union as Ukraine's "model for [Ukraine's] future political and economic development." He believes former President Viktor Yanukovych and his government were "deliberately destroying the integration (into Europe) prospects of Ukraine" and that Ukrainian politicians have no right to let them "rule after 2014". Klitschko is also in favour of NATO-Ukraine cooperation.

Klitschko's main concern is social standards and the economy of Ukraine. He believes "the issue of language is not the top priority". Klitschko wants less corruption and more transparency in Ukrainian politics. He also advocates lower taxes to stimulate the economy. Klitschko did accuse in October 2011 President Yanukovych and the Azarov Government of "doing everything to manipulate the rules to stay in power longer"; furthermore (in December 2011) he assert(ed) "every statement of the government" as "a continuation of lies and disinformation." He has also taken part in rallies for former Prime Minister Yulia Tymoshenko's release.

In December 2011, Klitschko described the judicial system of Ukraine as "complete degradation" and accused it of violating human rights and humiliating its prisoners. According to him, Ukraine lacks independent and unbiased judges because the "Ukrainian judiciary is currently a closed system with lifelong judges and appointments made through administrative leverage". He wants to ensure the independence of judges by switching from a system of appointed judges to a system of elected judges.

In July 2012, Klitschko stated that UDAR will not cooperate with the Party of Regions in the Ukrainian Parliament. In early April 2013 Klitschko called for early presidential and parliamentary elections in Ukraine.

Mayor of Kyiv

On 28 February 2014, Klitschko confirmed that he would take part in the (early) 2014 Ukrainian presidential election. On 29 March, he announced that he had changed his mind and would run for the post of Mayor of Kyiv in the 2014 Kyiv local election (including Mayoral elections) set for 25 May. In the 2014 Ukrainian presidential election Klitschko endorsed the candidacy of Petro Poroshenko. Klitschko won Kyiv's mayoral elections with almost 57% of the votes in the first round. He was sworn in as mayor on 5 June 2014. The same day the Ukrainian parliament had deprived Klitschko of his MP mandate (Ukrainian MPs are not entitled to combine parliamentary activities with any other public employment). Poroshenko was elected President of Ukraine on 25 May 2014.

In addition to mayoral elections, UDAR participated in the 2014 Kyiv local election. It won 30 seats in the party-list ballot (40.54% of votes) and 42 seats in constituencies, overall gaining 77 seats in the Kyiv City Council out of 120. This was the last time that half of the Kyiv City Council seats were elected in constituencies.

Poroshenko appointed Klitschko as head of Kyiv City State Administration on 25 June 2014.

Klitschko headed the election list of the Petro Poroshenko Bloc in the late October 2014 Ukrainian parliamentary election, but he vowed not to resign as Mayor of Kyiv. On 21 November 2014 Klitschko gave up his seat in the new parliament. Petro Poroshenko Bloc won the election with 132 seats out of 423 available.

On 28 August 2015, UDAR merged into Petro Poroshenko Bloc "Solidarity". Klitschko became the new party leader. In the 2015 Kyiv mayoral election, Klitschko was reelected with 66.5% of vote. For this, he needed a second round of mayoral elections between him and Boryslav Bereza, after Klitschko scored 40.5% of the vote and Bereza 8.8% in the first round. (Bereza gained 33.51% of the vote in the second round of Mayoral elections.) Petro Poroshenko Bloc gained 52 seats in the Kyiv City Council with 27.56% of votes. On 26 May 2016, Klitschko resigned as Petro Poroshenko Bloc chairman, after a new law barring a head of administration to be chairman or a member of a political party took effect on 1 May.

On 18 May 2019, Klitschko announced that UDAR would take part in the 2019 Ukrainian parliamentary election autonomously. In the election the party only competed in 15 single-mandate constituencies. It failed to win any seats.

According to the Ukrainian Constitution the head of the Kyiv City State Administration should resign after a new President is elected. However, following the 21 April 2019 election which was won by Volodymyr Zelenskyy, Klitschko was not dismissed. A 4 September 2019 decision by the Honcharuk Government to dismiss Klitschko was not executed.

In the election for Mayor of Kyiv of the 2020 Kyiv local election, Klitschko was again a candidate, nominated by UDAR. He was also endorsed by Petro Poroshenko's party, now named European Solidarity. He won the election in the first round with 50.52% of the votes, 365,161 people voted for him. UDAR won 30 Kyiv City Council seats out of 120 in the 2020 Kyiv local election with 19.98% of votes, finishing second behind European Solidarity (20.52% of votes; 31 seats). As of February 2023, Klitschko is the longest-serving Mayor of Kyiv since Ukraine gained its independence in 1991, having served for 8 years and 8 months, and the only person to have won three direct democratic Kyiv mayoral elections.

Klitschko is a member of the Washington, D.C.-headquartered International Republican Institute's International Advisory Council.

2022 Russian invasion of Ukraine

In February 2022, Klitschko and his brother pledged to take up arms to protect the capital of Ukraine, Kyiv, in response to Russia's invasion of Ukraine that began on 24 February. On 25 February, Klitschko posted a video on his Telegram channel to report on casualties in the capital city, stating, "The night was difficult, but there are no Russian troops in the capital. The enemy is trying to break into the city, in particular, from [the direction of] Hostomel, Zhytomyr." On 11 March Klitschko made a guest appearance on CNN's State of the Union.

On 15 March, Klitschko announced a 36-hour curfew from Tuesday night amid what he called a difficult and dangerous moment, stating, "I ask all Kyivites to get prepared to stay at home for two days, or if the sirens go off, in the shelters," About half of Kyiv's 3.4 million residents had fled, and many of those who remain are spending nights sheltering in underground stations. At the time, the capital was almost encircled by Russian forces. An armistice discussion was scheduled to occur. On 23 March, Klitschko and his brother reported from a bandstand in a park victories around Kyiv: Ukrainian forces had taken back most of Irpin (east of Kyiv), all of Makariv (west of Kyiv) and were battling for the village of Liutizh, 20 miles to the north. By 31 March, Russian forces had withdrawn from Kyiv. The following morning, Klitschko proclaimed a Ukrainian victory.

On 6 May, Klitschko warned on Telegram that there was a high probability of rocket fire across Ukraine in the coming days. There were no plans for a curfew but street patrols would be reinforced. On 23 May, Klitschko and Ukraine Foreign Minister Dmytro Kuleba were in Davos, Switzerland to attend the World Economic Forum annual meeting. Klitschko and his brother spoke at length to an audience the same day. They told delegates to back Ukraine despite the economic pain, and that "we are defending you". They later said in an interview with Sky News, that the "biggest mistake" their audience could make was to think that the "Ukraine war doesn't affect everyone."

On 18 June, Klitschko said that Vladimir Putin was destroying millions of lives in both Ukraine and Russia, adding that Russian soldiers are dying for nothing more than Putin's ambitions. At the end of June, the Klitschko brothers attended, along with a large delegation of Ukrainians, the 2022 NATO Madrid summit.

Sporting legacy

Having never been knocked down, Vitali Klitschko is widely regarded as the tougher fighter of the two brothers. His 87% knockout percentage is regarded as one of the best knockout-to-fight ratios of any champion in heavyweight boxing history. Vitali was also known for being unusually dominant in his fights, having almost never lost a round in his professional career as a boxer.
During his time as WBC champion, Vitali Klitschko was described as being the best of his time, and George Foreman stated that he has the best straight left in the division. Both Klitschko brothers are considered the best heavyweight boxers of their era. Having remained undefeated for a large majority of their careers and refusing to fight each other, both brothers remained largely unchallenged throughout their careers. Notably, both brothers were particularly well known for using their large size to nullify other heavyweights. In 2011, Wladimir and Vitali entered the Guinness World Records book as the pair of brothers with most world heavyweight title fight wins (30 at the time; 40 as of 2020).

Considered national heroes in Ukraine, in 2008 the Klitschko brothers were ranked number 15 in Inter's list of the 100 Greatest Ukrainians following a nation-wide poll that saw around 2.5 million people casting their votes. Boxing fights involving one of the Klitschko brothers attracted between 10 and 20 million viewers in Ukraine; some of their fights generated even bigger viewership numbers. Vitali has been named multiple times among the 100 most influential people in Ukraine by Korrespondent: he was ranked 60th in 2006, 44th in 2010, 41st in 2011, 16th in 2012, 10th in 2013, 23rd in 2017 and 28th in 2019 (the ranking wasn't conducted between 2014 and 2016).

The Klitschkos were also considered big stars in Germany. According to DW, a research conducted no later than 2011 showed that nearly 99% of people in Germany recognized the Klitschko brothers; a similar research carried out by TNS for the Horizont Sport Business in 2003 showed that Vitali had been recognized by 90.9% of respondents, making him the sixth most recognized athlete in Germany at the time. The CPI Index conducted by the agency Celebrity Performance in 2012 had the Klitschkos ranked second on the list of the most marketable celebrities in Germany, while in 2014, based on a survey of 1151 respondents that was conducted by the same agency, the Klitschko brothers were ranked 6th in the "Person of the Year" category. At least six of Vitali's fights generated above 10 million average viewers.

Throughout his career, Vitali has defeated 15 boxers for the world heavyweight title, the fifth-most in history (tied with Lennox Lewis), including two – Corrie Sanders and Danny Williams – for The Ring world heavyweight championship. Klitschko is one of nine boxers to defeat at least ten different fighters for the world heavyweight title. As of August 2022, BoxRec ranks Klitschko as the 16th greatest heavyweight boxer of all time. He is the only heavyweight boxer to have reigned as world champion in three different decades. Klitschko and George Foreman are the only heavyweight boxers in history to defend a world title after turning 40. According to BoxRec, Vitali has defeated 7 previously undefeated fighters with a combined record 135–0–3 (95 KOs) – these 7 included Alben Belinski (professional record 5–0, 5 KOs coming into the fight), Ed Mahone (21–0–2, 21 KOs), Timo Hoffmann (22–0, 13 KOs), Chris Arreola (27–0, 24 KOs), Kevin Johnson (22–0–1, 9 KOs), Odlanier Solis (17–0, 12 KOs) and Manuel Charr (21–0, 11 KOs).

At the end of 2004, Vitali was honoured with the Hero of Ukraine Order of State, the highest Ukrainian honour, for his achievements and contributions to the development of Ukrainian sports. In 2010, Vitali was awarded the German Cross of the Order of Merit, the highest German honour, for his social and political engagement. In 2013, Klitschko was awarded the Georgian Presidential Order of Excellence. In 2018, Vitali was inducted into the International Boxing Hall of Fame. He was elected in his first year of eligibility. Known for charity work and philanthropy, both Vitali and Wladimir are among only 15 current or former alive athletes that have been named UNESCO Champions for Sport.

Personal life 

Klitschko's father, Vladimir Rodionovich Klitschko (1947–2011), was a Soviet Air Force major general and a Soviet military attaché in East Germany. Vladimir's mother was Jewish. Part of Vitali's family died during Holodomor, while his great-grandfather and family members on the female line of his mother died in the Holocaust.

The Klitschko brothers lived as children in Czechoslovakia from 1980 to 1985, where their father was stationed with the Soviet occupation forces. They attended a school designated for children of Soviet soldiers in the town of Mimoň in Northern Bohemia.

The elder Klitschko was also one of the commanders in charge of cleaning up the effects of the Chernobyl nuclear disaster in 1986 and was afterward diagnosed with cancer. His mother is Nadezhda Ulyanovna.

Klitschko worked at Kyiv Automation Plant as a toolmaker as a young man.

Mykola Chynchyn, the chairman of the Main Investigation Department of the Ministry of Internal Affairs of Ukraine during the presidency of Viktor Yanukovych, accused Klitschko of working as a debt collector in the 1990s for mafia boss Viktor Rybalko. Klitschko has vehemently denied links to Rybalko.

Klitschko and Natalija Jehorova, a former athlete and model, married on 26 April 1996. They have three children. On 15 August 2022, Vitali announced that he and Natalija were divorcing.

In 1996, Klitschko graduated from the Pereyaslav-Khmelnytsky Pedagogical Institute (Ukraine) and was accepted into the postgraduate study program at the Taras Shevchenko National University of Kyiv. On 29 February 2000, he presented his doctoral thesis on "talent and sponsorship in sports" at the "Kyiv University of Physical Science and Sports" and his PhD in Sports Science was conferred.

In addition to residing in Kyiv, Klitschko has lived for years in Germany. According to Klitschko "Germany adopted me, I really love Germany, but I'm not German".

Both Klitschko and his brother Wladimir are avid chess players. Vitali is a friend of former world chess champion Vladimir Kramnik and the two have played, with Kramnik always winning. Klitschko has commented that "chess is similar to boxing. You need to develop a strategy, and you need to think two or three steps ahead about what your opponent is doing. You have to be smart. But what's the difference between chess and boxing? In chess, nobody is an expert, but everybody plays. In boxing everybody is an expert, but nobody fights."

Both Klitschko brothers also have been involved in charitable activities dedicated to supporting the needs of schools, churches and children. In 2002, the Klitschko brothers announced that they had agreed to work for UNESCO. Vitali and his brother never fought each other in a professional fight as their mother made them promise to never fight each other.

Klitschko is fluent in four languages: Ukrainian, Russian, English and German.

Awards and honors

 In 2010, Klitschko was awarded the German Cross of the Order of Merit for his social and political engagement
In 2013, Klitschko was awarded the Georgian Presidential Order of Excellence
 In 2016, Klitschko was named The Eternal world heavyweight champion by the WBC; the title is awarded to dominant boxers that were undefeated as champions and had plenty of successful title defenses throughout their careers
 In 2022, Klitschko was named an honorary member of the European Committee of the Regions
 In 2022, Klitschko was named winner of ESPY's Arthur Ashe Award For Courage

Professional boxing record

Television viewership

International

Germany

Ukraine

Russia

United States

Premium television

Pay-per-view bouts

Poland

Free-to-air television

Pay-per-view bouts

See also

List of The Ring world champions
List of world heavyweight boxing champions
 List of mayors of Kyiv

Notes

References

External links

 
 
 Real Stories: Vitali and Wladimir Klitschko at Grantland

1971 births
Living people
AIBA World Boxing Championships medalists
Anti-Russification activists
Congress of the Council of Europe
Doping cases in boxing
European Boxing Union champions
Governors of Kyiv
Heavyweight kickboxers
International Boxing Hall of Fame inductees

Kyrgyzstani emigrants to Ukraine
Kyrgyzstani people of Russian descent
Kyrgyzstani people of Ukrainian descent
Laureus World Sports Awards winners
Mayors of Kyiv
Seventh convocation members of the Verkhovna Rada
People from Chüy Region
People of the Euromaidan
Pro-Ukrainian people of the 2014 pro-Russian unrest in Ukraine
Recipients of the Cross of the Order of Merit of the Federal Republic of Germany
Recipients of the Presidential Order of Excellence
Recipients of the title of Hero of Ukraine
The Ring (magazine) champions
Ukrainian Democratic Alliance for Reform politicians
Ukrainian expatriate sportspeople in Germany
Ukrainian male boxers
Ukrainian male kickboxers
Ukrainian people of Russian descent
Ukrainian sportspeople in doping cases
Ukrainian sportsperson-politicians
World Boxing Organization champions
World Boxing Council champions
World heavyweight boxing champions
Recipients of the Honorary Diploma of the Cabinet of Ministers of Ukraine
People of the 2022 Russian invasion of Ukraine
Ukrainian people of Jewish descent